"The Sound of Bleeding Gums" is the 17th episode of the 33rd season of the American animated television series The Simpsons, and the 723rd episode overall. It aired in the United States on Fox on April 10, 2022. The episode was directed by Chris Clements and written by Loni Steele Sosthand.

Plot

Lisa Simpson becomes enraged when a song by Bleeding Gums Murphy is rewritten to promote the Springfield lottery, leading to her tracking down the late jazz musician's son Monk. When Lisa learns that Monk Murphy was born deaf and never heard his father's music, she goes on a crusade to both improve his life and seek justice for her mentor only to discover she and Monk are not on the same page.

Production
This episode marked the first time a deaf actor was cast on The Simpsons, John Autry II as Monk. The plot of the episode was inspired by the life of its writer, Loni Steele Sosthand, whose brother, Eli, is hearing impaired. American Sign Language was also used in the episode, and the producers used two ASL consultants to make sure the ASL was as accurate as possible, despite the limitation of Simpsons characters only having four fingers on each hand. Despite the coincidence of the timing, this episode was actually conceived before CODA. Other roles were played by three other deaf actors – Ian Mayorga, Kaylee Arellano, and Hazel Lopez – from No Limits, a nonprofit dedicated to deaf children. This is also the first speaking appearance of Bleeding Gums Murphy since the death of his original voice actor, Ron Taylor, in 2002. Here, Murphy is voiced in flashback and ghost form by Kevin Michael Richardson.

Reception

Tony Sokol of Den of Geek gave the episode a 3.5 out of 5 stars stating, "'The Sound of Bleeding Gums' is sweet, but not cavity-inducing. Homer is never prouder of Lisa than when she’s ready to quit, and even more so of Bart who never even tried. There is always dubious hope. The Simpsons’ latest season has seen a lot of character development liberally scattered throughout Springfield, much of it lateral."

Bubbleblabber gave the episode an 8.5/10 stating, "Overall, 'The Sound of Bleeding Gums' sees the show making history once again in its 33-season run. Its representation of the deaf community and a solid Lisa-focused storyline makes this a worthy historic moment for The Simpsons. Its humor also injected some enjoyment into the episode, mainly from Bart bothering Lisa and the flashback involving Lisa and Murphy performing 'Driving Miss Daisy'. With 'CODA' winning Best Picture and this week’s episode, it’s safe to say that the deaf community has a bright future in the media industry, especially in animation."

References

2022 American television episodes
The Simpsons (season 33) episodes
Television shows about deaf people
Works about jazz